Pietro di Niccolò da Orvieto (1430–1484) was an Italian Renaissance painter.

Not much is known about Pietro di Niccolò da Orvieto's life except through his works. He was born, worked, and lived all his life in Northern Italy, and his style puts him in the Umbrian School. He primarily painted religious-themed works for local church commissions. He died in 1484. One of his works is part of the Fitzwilliam Museum collection.

References

1430 births
1484 deaths
15th-century Italian painters
Italian male painters